2300 series may refer to:

Japanese train types
 Hankyu 2300 series EMU
 Meitetsu 2300 series EMU cars included in Meitetsu 1700 series trains (2008–2021) and Meitetsu 2200 series trains (2005–present) 
 Nankai 2300 series EMU
 Odakyu 2300 series EMU operated by the Odakyu Electric Railway
 Sanyo Electric Railway 2300 series EMU operated by the Sanyo Electric Railway